Galium xeroticum (Commonly known as Crimean Bedstraw) is a species of plant in the family Rubiaceae. It is endemic to the Crimean Peninsula on the north shore of the Black Sea.

References

External links

xeroticum
Flora of the Crimean Peninsula
Flora of Russia
Flora of Ukraine
Plants described in 1753
Taxa named by Carl Linnaeus